Minnesota State Highway 19 (MN 19) is a  highway in southwest and southeast Minnesota, which runs from South Dakota Highway 30 at the South Dakota state line near Ivanhoe and continues east to its eastern terminus at its intersection with U.S. Highway 61 in Red Wing.

The route essentially crosses the state of Minnesota, ending at Red Wing, about five miles (8 km) west of the bridge to Wisconsin.

Route description
State Highway 19 serves as an east–west route between Ivanhoe, Marshall, Redwood Falls, New Prague, Northfield, Cannon Falls, and Red Wing in southwest and southeast Minnesota.

Highway 19 parallels U.S. Highway 14 and U.S. Highway 212 for part of its route.

The route passes through the Richard J. Dorer State Forest in Goodhue County.

The Rush River State Wayside Park is located on Highway 19 in Sibley County.  The park is located west of Henderson.

History
State Highway 19 was authorized in 1933.

The last section of Highway 19 to be paved was in the mid-1950s, east of New Prague.

The stretch of Highway 19 between Red Wing and Gaylord was established as the Colvill Memorial Highway in 1931, and is still known by that name today.  It is named in honor of Colonel William J. Colvill, who led the 1st Minnesota Volunteer Infantry in the Battle of Gettysburg.

A new interchange was constructed in 2002 at the junction of Highway 19 and U.S. Highway 169 near Henderson.

Major intersections

References

External links

019
Transportation in Rice County, Minnesota
Transportation in Dakota County, Minnesota
Transportation in Goodhue County, Minnesota
Transportation in Sibley County, Minnesota
Transportation in Renville County, Minnesota
Transportation in Redwood County, Minnesota
Transportation in Lyon County, Minnesota
Transportation in Lincoln County, Minnesota
Transportation in Le Sueur County, Minnesota
Transportation in Scott County, Minnesota